Scrubs is an American medical comedy-drama television series created by Bill Lawrence, which premiered on October 2, 2001 on NBC. NBC had originally announced that Scrubs would end after its seventh season, containing a reduced 18 episodes. However, the 2007–2008 Writers Guild of America strike ended up cutting the show's episodes down to 11, and Scrubs ended its run on NBC with a total of 150 episodes.

The cast returned to film an additional 18 episodes, which were aired as Season 8 by ABC, with much of the story coming to a close, and definitive though somewhat flexible endings for the characters. The one-hour season finale, "My Finale", which was originally planned to also be the series finale, ranked third in the ratings and was watched by 5.1 million viewers, 2.1 adults 18-49 rating. The episode garnered mostly positive response from the viewers as well as critics.

With speculation mounting over a possible ninth season that would focus on new characters and perhaps a new setting, ABC announced on May 15, 2009, that it renewed Scrubs for a ninth season called Scrubs: Med School. The season premiered on December 1, 2009. Donald Faison and John C. McGinley are the only original cast members returning as regular characters, while Zach Braff appeared in six episodes. Sarah Chalke, Neil Flynn and Ken Jenkins returned as guest stars, while Judy Reyes did not appear at all.

In addition to the regular episodes, a special called "My Charlie Brown Christmas" was created by Daniel Russ and Ryan Levin for the Scrubs 2003 Christmas party, which is a re-cut and re-dub of A Charlie Brown Christmas, starring the cast of Scrubs.

As a general rule, all series episode titles begin with the word "My", unless the bulk of the episode is narrated by someone other than J.D., in which case they are named "His Story", "Her Story", or "Their Story", with Roman numerals denoting subsequent episodes by the same name. During Season 9, episode titles started with the word "Our" instead of "My".

A total of 182 episodes of Scrubs were broadcast over nine seasons. All nine seasons are available on DVD in Regions 1, 2 and 4.

Series overview

Episodes

Season 1 (2001–02)

Season 2 (2002–03)

Season 3 (2003–04)

Season 4 (2004–05)

Season 5 (2006)

Season 6 (2006–07)

Season 7 (2007–08)

Season 8 (2009)

Season 9 (2009–10)

Notes
 denotes a "supersized" episode, running an extended length of 25–28 minutes.

References

General references

External links

 

 
Lists of American comedy-drama television series episodes
Lists of American sitcom episodes
Lists of medical television series episodes

it:Scrubs - Medici ai primi ferri#Episodi